The discography of Smoke DZA, an American hip hop artist, consists of eight studio albums, twenty-five mixtapes, and thirteen singles, (including seven as a featured artist).

Albums

Studio albums

Mixtapes/EPs

Singles

As lead artist

As featured artist

Promotional single

Guest appearances

Videography

References

Discographies of American artists
Hip hop discographies